Santa Rita is a town in the southwest of the Ayotlán Municipality, Jalisco. It has 2,608 inhabitants during the 2020 Mexico census, it is located at 11.4 km from Ayotlán, 36 km from Atotonilco El Alto and 21 km from Yurécuaro, Michoacán.

This place is better known due to the water park located at the entrance of the town, towards Yurécuaro.

References 

Populated places in Jalisco